Gray Matters is a 2006 American romantic comedy film directed and written by Sue Kramer, starring Heather Graham, Tom Cavanagh, and Bridget Moynahan. The film premiered at the Hamptons International Film Festival on October 21, 2006. It opened in limited release in the United States on February 23, 2007.

Plot
Gray, a family oriented and quiet bachelorette, lives a close-knit life with her brother, Sam. Their lifestyle is generally co-dependent, involving them living together, going to dance classes together, etc. Gray and Sam's relationship has never been thought of as strange, but once a dinner party guest mistakes the siblings as a couple, Gray and Sam decide to venture outside of one another. While discussing what they can do about their single lifestyles and how they can "hook each other up" with a significant other, their conversation continues to the park, where Gray spots a possible girlfriend for Sam. Gray introduces herself to Charlie, then to Sam, and the two instantly like each other, agreeing to see each other again.

To Gray's surprise, Sam and Charlie become engaged the morning after their meeting. Charlie and Sam are so madly in love with one another that they plan to go to Las Vegas the following morning and elope there. They invite Gray along. Gray is a little hesitant, but agrees when Charlie says they can have a "mini bachelorette party". Gray agrees and the three make their way to Vegas. While in Vegas, Gray takes Charlie out for a hen night, and after many drinks, the two share a drunken but passionate kiss. The next morning, Charlie does not remember anything, but Gray has not slept the whole night, because of how she felt with Charlie. The situation makes Gray finally realize that not only is she attracted to women, but is falling in love with her sister-in-law.

The events in Vegas force a journey of self-discovery, testing the relationship between two very close siblings, and to finding happiness in lonely Manhattan. When Gray eventually comes out to Sam as a lesbian, he tells her that he has known all along, since they were young kids.

Later, Sam accidentally discloses Gray's sexual orientation to her entire office, which, along with Sam's encouragement, gives her impetus to find her true self, pursue relationships with women, and find her own someone to love.

Cast

Production
Gray Matters was shot on location in New York City in twenty-one days. The screenplay was partially inspired by the life of the director's sister, Carolyn.

Release
Gray Matters premiered at the Hamptons International Film Festival, in the Spotlight section, on October 21, 2006. It opened theatrically in limited release in New York and Los Angeles on February 23, 2007.

Home media
The DVD was released in Region 1 by Fox Home Entertainment on June 19, 2007. It was released in Region 2 by Momentum Pictures on August 13, 2007.

Reception
On Rotten Tomatoes the film has an approval rating of 8% based on reviews from 66 critics.
On Metacritic it has a score of 31% based on 19 reviews, indicating "generally unfavorable reviews".

References

External links
 
 
  Gray Matters at Yari Film Group
  Gray Matters at BFI

2006 films
2006 directorial debut films
2006 LGBT-related films
2006 romantic comedy films
American LGBT-related films
American romantic comedy films
Lesbian-related films
Films set in New York City
2000s English-language films
2000s American films